Globe Hotel in McDonough, Georgia, USA, also known as Dunn House, was built in 1827 and expanded in the late 1800s. It is a two-story frame building. In the 1930s, the building was moved about one block from its original location facing the courthouse square. It has some elements of Stick/Eastlake architecture in the newer section.

It was listed on the National Register of Historic Places in 1985.

References

External links

Hotel buildings on the National Register of Historic Places in Georgia (U.S. state)
Queen Anne architecture in Georgia (U.S. state)
Buildings and structures in Henry County, Georgia
Commercial buildings completed in 1827
National Register of Historic Places in Henry County, Georgia
1827 establishments in Georgia (U.S. state)